Pakka Di Saral is a Union council in the Islamabad Capital Territory of Pakistan. It is located at 33° 18' 45N 73° 20' 25E with an altitude of 441 metres (1450 feet).

References 

Union councils of Islamabad Capital Territory